The 2017 Challenger Banque Nationale de Gatineau was a professional tennis tournament played on outdoor hard courts. It was the 2nd edition of the tournament for men and the 4th for women, and it was part of the 2017 ATP Challenger Tour and the 2017 ITF Women's Circuit, offering totals of $75,000 for men and $25,000 for women in prize money. It took place in Gatineau, Canada between July 17 and 23, 2017.

Men's singles main-draw entrants

Seeds

1 Rankings are as of July 3, 2017

Other entrants
The following players received wildcards into the singles main draw:
 Philip Bester
 Liam Broady
 Filip Peliwo
 Benjamin Sigouin

The following player received entry into the singles main draw using a protected ranking:
 Bradley Klahn

The following players received entry into the singles main draw as alternates:
 Daniel Nguyen
 Max Purcell

The following players received entry from the qualifying draw:
 JC Aragone
 Sekou Bangoura
 Marcos Giron
 Mikael Torpegaard

Women's singles main-draw entrants

Seeds

1 Rankings are as of July 3, 2017

Other entrants
The following players received wildcards into the singles main draw:
 Carson Branstine
 Anca Craciun
 Leylah Annie Fernandez
 Layne Sleeth

The following player entered the singles main draw with a protected ranking:
 Kimberly Birrell

The following players received entry from the qualifying draw:
 Elena Bovina
 Alexa Guarachi
 Nika Kukharchuk
 Samantha Murray
 Ellen Perez
 Emily Webley-Smith
 Marcela Zacarías
 Amy Zhu

Champions

Men's singles

 Denis Shapovalov def.  Peter Polansky, 6–1, 3–6, 6–3

Women's singles

 Aleksandra Wozniak def.  Ellen Perez, 7–6(7–4), 6–4

Men's doubles

 Bradley Klahn /  Jackson Withrow def.  Hans Hach Verdugo /  Vincent Millot, 6–2, 6–3

Women's doubles

 Hiroko Kuwata /  Valeria Savinykh def.  Kimberly Birrell /  Emily Webley-Smith, 4–6, 6–3, [10–5]

External links
Official website

Challenger Banque Nationale de Gatineau
Challenger Banque Nationale de Gatineau
Challenger de Gatineau
Challenger Banque Nationale de Gatineau